The Roman Catholic Diocese of Risan(o) or Risinio (Latin Risinium) was a Latin Catholic bishopric from the sixth to the 17th century and is now a Latin titular see.

History 
Established  as Diocese of Risano (Italian; Latin Risinium) with see at Risan, site of Ancient Rhizon. It was a suffragan of the Metropolitan (also Montenegrine) Archdiocese of Diocleia in the Late Roman province of Dalmatia Superior.

It was suppressed , its territory being merged into the Roman Catholic Diocese of Kotor (Cattaro), also in Montenegro.

Episcopal ordinaries 
(all Roman Rite)

Suffragan bishops of Risano
(incomplete in the sixth and possibly until the 13th century)
 Sebastiano(591? – 595?)
vacancy?
 Michele, Augustinians (O.E.S.A.)(1271? – ?)
 Davide da Ginevra, O.E.S.A.(1327? – 1349?)
 Nicola, Conventual Friars Minor (O.F.M. Conv.) (? – death 1350?)
 Doimo, O.F.M.(1351.03.28 – 1352.10.25), next Bishop of Kotor (Cattaro) (Montenegro) (1352.10.25 – 1368?)
 Cesario(? – 1355)
 Dionigi(? – 1400), next Bishop of Kotor (Cattaro) (Montenegro) (1400 – ?)
 Andrea (1400 – ?)
 Enrico de Tolnis, Carmelites (O. Carm.) (1400.06.16 – ?)
 Costantino Clementi, O.F.M. (1423.07.09 – ?)
 Egidio Byedborch, O. Carm. (1428.11.29 – ?)
 Antun Bogdanović (1434.04.12 – ?), apparently first Slavic native incumbent
 Giovanni da Montemartino, O.F.M. (1434.09.01 – ?)
 Dionisio Stefani, O. Carm. (1436.10.17 – ?)
 Giovanni Mattei, O. Carm. (1453.01.12 – ?)
 Heinrich Hopfgarten (1455.11.21 – 1460.03.24), also Titular Bishop of  (1455.11.21 – death 1460.03.24) as Auxiliary Bishop of Mainz (Mayene, western Germany) (1455.11.21 – 1460.03.24)
 Daniele(1470.12.10 – ?)
 Raphael (1487.02.16 – ?)
 Adriano de Arnoldis, O. Carm. (1518.09.18 – ?)
 Antonio Pasquali, O.F.M. Conv. (1520.10.12 – ?)
 Miguel de Sanguesa, Cistercians (O. Cist.) (1537.04.29 – death 1548), also Titular Bishop of  (1537.04.20 – 1548) as Auxiliary Bishop of Tarazona (Spain) (1537.04.20 – 1548)
 André Tissier, O.F.M. (1551.03.04 – ?)
 György Zalatnaky (1551.03.04 – 1600.12.20), previously Bishop of Knin (? – 1598.04.16); later Bishop of Pécs (Hungary) (1600.12.20 – death 1605)
 Alfonso de Requeséns Fenollet, O.F.M. (1610.08.30 – 1625.10.06); previously Bishop of Duvno (Bosnia and Herzegovina) (1610.08.30 – 1625.10.06); later Bishop of Barbastro (Spain) (1625.10.06 – 1639.04.08)
 Vincenzo Zucconi (1627.08.30 – ?), also Bishop of Duvno (Bosnia and Herzegovina) (1627.08.30 – ?)

Titular see 
The diocese was nominally restored in 1933 as Latin Titular bishopric of Risinium (Latin name; Curiate Italian Risinio)

It has had the following incumbents, of the fitting (lowest) episcopal rank with two archiepiscopal exceptions:
TO BE ELABORATED
 Ubald Langlois, Missionary Oblates of Mary Immaculate (O.M.I.) (1938.03.30 – 1953.09.18)
 Alphonse-Célestin-Basile Baud, Capuchin Frirs Minor (O.F.M. Cap.) (1954.04.10 – 1955.09.14)
 Raul Zambrano Camader (1956.12.29 – 1962.04.26)
 Charles Borromeo McLaughlin (1964.01.13 – 1968.05.02)
 Titular Archbishop Paolo Botto (1969.05.02 – 1970.12.03)
 Titular Archbishop Reginaldo Giuseppe Maria Addazi, Dominican Order (O.P.) (1971.07.03 – 1975.02.07)
 Giovanni Pes (1975.04.25 – 1979.05.23)
 Władysław Ziółek (1980.03.12 – 1986.01.24) (later Archbishop)
 Abraham Escudero Montoya (1986.05.22 – 1990.04.30)
 John Richard McNamara (1992.04.14 – 2001.04.16)
 Bishop Gáspár Ladocsi (2001.11.28 – ...), Auxiliary Bishop emeritus of Esztergom–Budapest (Hungary)

Sources and external links 
 GCatholic 

Catholic titular sees in Europe